Time in Poland is given by Central European Time (CET; UTC+01:00). Daylight saving time, which moves an hour ahead, is observed from the last Sunday in March (02:00 CET) to the last Sunday in October (03:00 CEST). This is shared with several other EU member states.

History 
In the early nineteenth century, Poland observed UTC+01:24 as it was the time corresponding to the offset of their local mean time at the Warsaw meridian, which was also known as Warsaw mean time. Warsaw switched to CET on 5 August 1915, and the rest of Poland officially adopted CET on 31 May 1922. After World War II, daylight saving time was introduced in 1946 by a resolution of the Council of Ministers, though it would be repealed on 21 September 1949. Daylight saving time was in use again between 1957 and 1964, and has been in use since 1977.

In 2021, following the European parliament's vote to end daylight saving time, the Centre for Public Opinion Research conducted a survey regarding the time shift, which showed 78 percent of Poles surveyed were not in favour of daylight saving time. Despite this, however, it is not yet known whether the last time change in Poland will occur in 2021 or continue to be observed as there are currently no legal regulations for it.

Daylight saving time 
Daylight saving time, which moves an hour ahead, is observed from the last Sunday in March (02:00 CET) to the last Sunday in October (03:00 CEST). DST has been in use since 1977, however it was previously used between 1946 to 1949 and 1957 to 1964.

Notation 

Polish people use both the 12-hour clock and 24-hour clock, though the 12-hour clock is more commonly used in speech when unambiguous, with the AM/PM distinction denoted by phrases in Polish when needed; written communication uses 24-hour clock almost universally, including written forms of informal speech and exclusively in official documents.

IANA time zone database 
In the IANA time zone database, Poland is given one zone in the file zone.tab – Europe/Warsaw. Data for Poland directly from zone.tab of the IANA time zone database; columns marked with * are the columns from zone.tab itself:

See also 
Time in Europe
List of time zones by country
List of time zones by UTC offset

References

External links 
Current time in Poland at Time.is
Time in Poland at Lonely Planet
Time changes in Poland at WorldData.info